
Gmina Mońki is an urban-rural gmina (administrative district) in Mońki County, Podlaskie Voivodeship, in northeastern Poland.

Villages
Apart from the town of Mońki, Gmina Mońki contains the villages and settlements of Boguszewo, Ciesze, Czekołdy, Dudki, Dudki-Kolonia, Dziękonie, Dzieżki, Ginie, Hornostaje, Hornostaje-Osada, Jaski, Kiślaki, Koleśniki, Kołodzież, Konopczyn, Kosiorki, Kropiwnica, Krzeczkowo, Kuczyn, Kulesze, Lewonie, Łupichy, Magnusze, Masie, Mejły, Moniuszeczki, Ołdaki, Oliszki, Potoczyzna, Przytulanka, Pyzy, Rusaki, Rybaki, Sikory, Sobieski, Świerzbienie, Waśki, Wojszki, Zalesie, Zblutowo, Znoski, Żodzie and Zyburty.

Neighbouring gminas
Gmina Mońki is bordered by the gminas of Goniądz, Jaświły, Knyszyn, Krypno and Trzcianne.

References
Polish official population figures 2006

Monki
Mońki County